Quasieulia jaliscana is a species of moth of the family Tortricidae. It is found in the Mexican states of Jalisco, Oaxaca, Puebla and Veracruz.

The length of the forewings is 6.8-7.3 mm for males and 5.9-7.8 mm for females. The ground colour of the forewings is whitish with an admixture of brown and suffused brown except for the dorso-anterior area. The hindwings are whitish, tinged cream on the periphery and strigulated (finely streaked) grey.

Etymology
The species name refers to the state of Jalisco, Mexico.

References

Moths described in 2004
Euliini
Moths of Central America
Taxa named by Józef Razowski